In criminal law, kidnapping is the unlawful confinement of a person against their will, often including transportation/asportation. The asportation and abduction element is typically but not necessarily conducted by means of force or fear: the perpetrator may use a weapon to force the victim into a vehicle, but it is still kidnapping if the victim is enticed to enter the vehicle willingly (e.g. in the belief that it is a taxicab).

Kidnapping may be done to demand for ransom in exchange for releasing the victim, or for other illegal purposes. Kidnapping can be accompanied by bodily injury which elevates the crime to aggravated kidnapping.

Kidnapping of a child is known as child abduction, which is a separate legal category.

Motivations

Kidnapping of children is usually done by one parent or others. The kidnapping of adults is often for ransom or to force someone to withdraw money from an ATM, but may also be for sexual assault. Children have also been kidnapped for the commission of sexual assault.

In the past, and presently in some parts of the world (such as southern Sudan), kidnapping is a common means used to obtain slaves and money through ransom. In less recent times, kidnapping in the form of shanghaiing (or "pressganging") men were used to supply merchant ships in the 19th century with sailors, whom the law considered unfree labour.

Criminal gangs are estimated to make up to $500 million a year in ransom payments from kidnapping.

Kidnapping has been identified as one source by which terrorist organizations have been known to obtain funding. The Perri, Lichtenwald and MacKenzie article identified "tiger" kidnapping as a specific method used by either the Real Irish Republican Army or Continuity Irish Republican Army, in which a kidnapped family member is used to force someone to steal from their employer.

 Bride kidnapping is a term often applied loosely, to include any bride "abducted" against the will of her parents, even if she is willing to marry the "abductor". It still is traditional amongst certain nomadic peoples of Central Asia. It has seen a resurgence in Kyrgyzstan since the fall of the Soviet Union and the subsequent erosion of women's rights.
 Express kidnapping is a method of abduction used in some countries, mainly from Latin America, where a small ransom, that a company or family can easily pay, is demanded.
 Tiger kidnapping is taking a hostage to make a loved one or associate of the victim do something (e.g. a child is taken hostage to force the shopkeeper to open the safe). The term originates from the usually long preceding observation, like a tiger does on the prowl.

Kidnapping has sometimes been used by the family and friends of a member of an alleged cult as a method to remove the member from the alleged cult and begin a deprogramming process. Deprogramming and exit counseling have been used with the purpose of getting alleged cult members to abandon their groups' beliefs. The danger presented by cult groups has been used by deprogrammers to justify using the extreme act of kidnapping to get alleged members to change their allegiance away from the group.

By jurisdiction

Australia
In Australia, kidnapping is a criminal offence, as defined by either the State crimes act, or the Commonwealth Criminal Code. It is a serious indictable offence, and is punishable by up to 14 – 25 years imprisonment.

Canada
Kidnapping that does not result in a homicide is a hybrid offence that comes with a maximum possible penalty of life imprisonment (18 months if tried summarily). A murder that results from kidnapping is classified as 1st-degree, with a sentence of life imprisonment that results from conviction (the mandatory penalty for murder under Canadian law).

Colombia
According to a 2022 study by political scientist Danielle Gilbert, armed groups in Colombia engage in ransom kidnappings as a way to maintain the armed groups' local systems of taxation. The groups resort to ransom kidnappings to punish tax evasion and incentivize inhabitants not to shirk.

Netherlands
Article 282 prohibits hostaging (and 'kidnapping' is a kind of 'hostaging'). Part 1 of Article 282 allows sentencing kidnappers to maximum imprisonment of 8 years or a fine of the fifth category. Part 2 allows maximum imprisonment of 9 years or a fine of the fifth category if there are serious injuries. Part 3 allows maximum imprisonment of 12 years or a fine of the fifth category if the victim has been killed. Part 4 allows sentencing people that collaborate with kidnapping (such as proposing or make available a location where the victim hostaged). Part 1, 2 and 3 will apply also to them.

United Kingdom
Kidnapping is an offence under the common law of England and Wales. Lord Brandon said in 1984 R v D:

In all cases of kidnapping of children, where it is alleged that a child has been kidnapped, it is the absence of the consent of that child which is material. This is the case regardless of the age of the child. A very small child will not have the understanding or intelligence to consent. This means that absence of consent will be a necessary inference from the age of the child. It is a question of fact for the jury whether an older child has sufficient understanding and intelligence to consent. Lord Brandon said: "I should not expect a jury to find at all frequently that a child under fourteen had sufficient understanding and intelligence to give its consent." If the child (being capable of doing so) did consent to being taken or carried away, the fact that the person having custody or care and control of that child did not consent to that child being taken or carried away is immaterial. If, on the other hand, the child did not consent, the consent of the person having custody or care and control of the child may support a defence of lawful excuse. It is known as Gillick competence.

Regarding restriction on prosecution, no prosecution may be instituted, except by or with the consent of the Director of Public Prosecutions, for an offence of kidnapping if it was committed against a child under the age of sixteen and by a person connected with the child, within the meaning of section 1 of the Child Abduction Act 1984. Kidnapping is an indictable-only offence. Kidnapping is punishable with imprisonment or fine at the discretion of the court. There is no limit on the fine or the term of imprisonment that may be imposed provided the sentence is not inordinate.

A parent should only be prosecuted for kidnapping their own child "in exceptional cases, where the conduct of the parent concerned is so bad that an ordinary right-thinking person would immediately and without hesitation regard it as criminal in nature".

United States

Law in the United States follows from English common law. Following the highly publicized 1932 Lindbergh kidnapping, Congress passed the Federal Kidnapping Act, which authorized the FBI to investigate kidnapping at a time when the Bureau was expanding in size and authority. The fact that a kidnapped victim may have been taken across state lines brings the crime within the ambit of federal criminal law.

Most states recognize different types of kidnapping and punish according to such factors as the location, duration, method, manner and purpose of the offense. There are several deterrents to kidnapping in the United States of America. Among these are:

 The extreme logistical challenges involved in successfully exchanging the money for the return of the victim without being apprehended or surveilled.
 Harsh punishment. Convicted kidnappers face lengthy prison terms. If a victim is brought across state lines, federal charges can be laid as well.
 Good cooperation and information sharing between law enforcement agencies, and tools for spreading information to the public (such as the AMBER Alert system).

One notorious failed example of kidnap for ransom was the 1976 Chowchilla bus kidnapping, in which 26 children were abducted with the intention of bringing in a $5 million ransom. The children and driver escaped from an underground van without the aid of law enforcement. According to the Department of Justice, kidnapping makes up 2% of all reported violent crimes against juveniles.

From the 1990s on, the New York divorce coercion gang was involved in the kidnapping and torture of Jewish husbands in New York City and New Jersey for the purpose of forcing them to grant gittin (religious divorces) to their wives. They were finally apprehended on October 9, 2013, in connection with a foiled kidnapping plot.

According to a 2003 Domestic Violence Report in Colorado, out of a survey of 189 incidents, most people (usually white females) are taken from their homes or residence by a present or former spouse or significant other. They are usually taken by force, not by weapon, and usually the victims are not injured when they are freed.

In 2009, Phoenix, Arizona reported over 300 cases of kidnapping, although subsequent investigation found that the Phoenix police falsified data.  If true, this would have been the highest rate of any U.S. city and second in the world only to Mexico City. A rise in kidnappings in the southwestern United States in general has been attributed to misclassification by local police, lack of a unified standard, desire for Federal grants, or the Mexican Drug War.

In 2010, the United States was ranked sixth in the world (by absolute numbers, not per capita) for kidnapping for ransom, according to the available statistics (after Colombia, Italy, Lebanon, Peru, and the Philippines).

In 2009, the Los Angeles Times named Phoenix, Arizona, as America's kidnapping capital, reporting that every year hundreds of ransom kidnappings occur there, virtually all within the underworld associated with human and drug smuggling from Mexico, and often done as a way of collecting unpaid debts. However, a later audit by the U.S. Department of Justice Inspector General found only 59 federally reportable kidnappings in 2008, compared to the over 300 claimed on grant applications.

During the year 1999 in the United States, 203,900 children were reported as the victims of family abductions and 58,200 of non-family abductions. However, only 115 were the result of "stereotypical" kidnaps (by someone unknown or of slight acquaintance to the child, held permanently or for ransom).

Statistics

Countries with the highest rates

Kidnapping for ransom is a common occurrence in various parts of the world today, and certain cities and countries are often described as the "Kidnapping Capital of the World". In 2018 the UN found Pakistan and England had the highest amount of kidnappings while New Zealand had the highest rate among the 70 countries for which data is available. As of 2007, that title belonged to Iraq with possibly 1,500 foreigners kidnapped. In 2004, it was Mexico, and in 2001, it was Colombia. Statistics are harder to come by. Reports suggest a world total of 12,500–25,500 per year with 3,600 per year in Colombia and 3,000 per year in Mexico around the year 2000. However, by 2016, the number of kidnappings in Colombia had declined to 205 and it continues to decline. Mexican numbers are hard to confirm because of fears of police involvement in kidnapping. "Kidnapping seems to flourish particularly in fragile states and conflict countries, as politically motivated militias, organized crime and the drugs mafia fill the vacuum left by government".

Pirates
Kidnapping on the high seas in connection with piracy has been increasing. It was reported that 661 crewmembers were taken hostage and 12 kidnapped in the first nine months of 2009. The IMB Piracy Reporting Centre recorded that 141 crew members were taken hostage and 83 were kidnapped in 2018.

See also

 
 Child abduction
 Extraordinary rendition
 Fetal abduction
 Gooning
 Forced disappearance
 Hostage
 Human trafficking
 Kidnap and ransom insurance
 Kidnappings in Colombia
 List of kidnappings
 Stockholm syndrome

References

Further reading

External links

 "Snatched: Notorious Kidnappings" —slideshow by Life magazine

 
Common law offences in England and Wales
Violent crime
Crimes
Organized crime activity
Terrorism tactics